Erythrocles is a genus of fish in the family Emmelichthyidae, the rovers.

Species
There are currently six recognized species in this genus:
 Erythrocles acarina Kotthaus, 1974
 Erythrocles microceps Miyahara & Okamura, 1998
 Erythrocles monodi Poll & Cadenat, 1954 – Atlantic rubyfish
 Erythrocles schlegelii (J. Richardson, 1846) – Japanese rubyfish
 Erythrocles scintillans (D. S. Jordan & W. F. Thompson, 1912) – golden kali kali
 Erythrocles taeniatus J. E. Randall & Rivaton, 1992

References

Emmelichthyidae
Taxa named by David Starr Jordan